SDB-006 is a drug that acts as a potent agonist for the cannabinoid receptors, with an EC50 of 19 nM for human CB2 receptors, and 134 nM for human CB1 receptors. It was discovered during research into the related compound SDB-001 which had been sold illicitly as "2NE1". SDB-006 metabolism has been described in literature.

See also 
 5F-CUMYL-PINACA
 5F-SDB-006
 APINACA
 CUMYL-PICA
 CUMYL-PINACA
 CUMYL-THPINACA
 SDB-001
 SDB-005
 STS-135

References 

Cannabinoids
Designer drugs
Indoles
Indolecarboxamides